= Mukhamet Shayakhmetov =

Kazakh writer (1922–2010)

Mukhamet Shayakhmetov (1922–2010) was a Kazakh writer, primarily known for his first-hand account of collectivization and famine in the Stalinist Kazakh SSR.

== Biography ==
Born into a relatively well-off family of Kazakh nomads, his family suffered grievously during the forced collectivization programme of Joseph Stalin. Shayakhmetov was only seven years old when his father and his uncle became victims of collectivization; the eventual death toll among the Kazakh nation was estimated at over a million. He was then conscripted into the Red Army and fought in the Battle of Stalingrad. Returning afterwards to Kazakhstan, he became a teacher.

He is best known today for The Silent Steppe (2006), his account of his childhood and youth set against the backdrop of the traumatic upheavals of the 1920s through the 1940s. The book has been translated into English by Jan Butler.
